India competed at the 2012 Summer Olympics in London, from 27 July to 12 August 2012.  A total of 83 athletes, 60 men and 23 women, competed in 13 sports. Men's field hockey was the only team-based sport in which India had its representation in these Olympic Games. India also marked its Olympic return in weightlifting, after the International Weightlifting Federation imposed a two-year suspension for the nation's athletes in Beijing because of a doping scandal.

The Indian team featured several Olympic medalists from Beijing, including rifle shooter and Olympic gold medalist Abhinav Bindra, who failed to advance into the final rounds of his event in London. Wrestler and Olympic bronze medalist Sushil Kumar managed to claim another medal by winning silver in the men's freestyle wrestling. The Indian Olympic Association also appointed him to be the nation's flag bearer at the opening ceremony.

This was India's 2nd most successful Olympics in terms of total medal tally, having won a total of 6 medals (2 silver and 4 bronze), doubling the nation's previous record (3 medals at the 2008 Beijing Olympics). Two medals each were awarded to the athletes in shooting and wrestling. India also set a historical milestone for the female athletes who won two Olympic medals for the first time. Badminton player and world junior champion Saina Nehwal became the first Indian athlete to win an Olympic bronze medal in the women's singles. Boxer Mary Kom, on the other hand, lost to Great Britain's Nicola Adams in the semi-final match, but settled for the bronze in the first ever women's flyweight event.

Medalists

Competitors

Archery

Six Indian archers qualified for the London Olympics – 3 in women's recurve and 3 in men's recurve.
Men

Women

Athletics

Fourteen Indian athletes qualified for the Athletics events (up to a maximum of 3 athletes in each event at the 'A' Standard, and 1 at the 'B' Standard).:

Men
Track & road events

Field events

Women
Track & road events

Field events

Key
Note–Ranks given for track events are within the athlete's heat only
Q = Qualified for the next round
q = Qualified for the next round as a fastest loser or, in field events, by position without achieving the qualifying target
NR = National record
SB = Seasonal best
N/A = Round not applicable for the event
Bye = Athlete not required to compete in round

Badminton

5 Indian badminton players qualified for the London Olympics.

Boxing

Eight Indian boxers qualified for the London Olympics.

Men

Women

Field hockey

The Indian national Hockey team, on 26 February 2012, had qualified for the 2012 Summer Olympics after winning the qualifying tournament against France with a score of 8–1.

India was placed in Pool B of the men's tournament.

Men's tournament

Roster

Group play
All times are British Summer Time, (UTC+1).

11th–12th Place

This was the worst show ever by India at the Olympics.

Judo

There was only one Indian judoka at the London Olympics.

Rowing

India had qualified the following boats.

Men

Qualification Legend: FA=Final A (medal); FB=Final B (non-medal); FC=Final C (non-medal); FD=Final D (non-medal); FE=Final E (non-medal); FF=Final F (non-medal); SA/B=Semifinals A/B; SC/D=Semifinals C/D; SE/F=Semifinals E/F; Q=Quarterfinals; R=Repechage

Shooting

Eleven Indian shooters qualified for the London Olympics, with seven male and four female competitors. India had earned 11 quotas in shooting events. India has been most successful in this category this year with Gagan Narang and Vijay Kumar winning bronze and silver medals respectively.

Men

Women

Swimming

India had gained a "Universality place" from the FINA.

Men

Table tennis

India had won 2 quotas in table tennis.

Tennis

India had won 7 quotas in tennis.
Men

Women

Mixed

Weightlifting

India had won 2 quotas in weightlifting.

Wrestling

India had won 5 quotas in the following events.

Key:
  - Victory by Fall.
  - Decision by Points - the loser with technical points.
  - Decision by Points - the loser without technical points.

Men's freestyle

Women's freestyle

Controversies

Opening ceremony
An unknown woman in civilian attire was seen walking at the head of the Indian Olympic team's march past during the Parade of Nations. Her presence attracted media attention throughout India and raised questions about security at the Olympic Games. The woman was subsequently identified as Madhura Nagendra (incorrectly referred to by some sources as Madhura Honey), a graduate student from Bangalore living in London and a dancer in a segment of the opening ceremony co-ordinated by Danny Boyle.
The London Organising Committee of the Olympic Games issued an apology to the Indian contingent over the incident and revoked Nagendra's Olympic security accreditation. On her return to India, Nagendra issued a public apology for her "error of judgement".

Boxing
Boxer Sumit Sangwan lost a closely contested bout 14–15 against Yamaguchi Falcao Florentino of Brazil in the light heavyweight category round of 32. The ESPN commentators described the loss as "daylight robbery." India's acting chef-de-mission Brigadier P. K. M. Raja, on the insistence of Sports Minister Ajay Maken, lodged an unsuccessful appeal against the judges' decision believing he had won.

A win by Vikas Krishan in the welterweight pre-quarters was overturned after an appeal by the opponent Errol Spence. The Indian was given four penalty points and the score was changed from 11–13 to 15–13 in favour of Errol Spence. The decision was overturned citing the nine holding fouls committed by the Indian boxer in the third round and for spitting out the gumshield intentionally. As the jury's decision was final, no further appeal by the Indians were permitted. India through its Acting Chef de Mission Brigadier PKM Raja approached the Court of Arbitration for Sport (CAS) but the appeal was rejected.

Boxer Manoj Kumar lost his pre quarterfinal light welterweight bout against Great Britain's Tom Stalker in a controversial manner. The boxer was at the wrong end of some of the judging calls and he cried "cheating" openly before leaving the boxing arena.

Badminton
Jwala Gutta and Ashwini Ponnappa missed out on a badminton - women's doubles quarterfinal berth by a difference of one point after tying with Japan and Taipei on points. Prior to India's final group game, the Japanese partnership of Mizuki Fujii and Reika Kakiiwa  lost to Chinese Taipei's Cheng Wen Hsing and Chien Yu Chin. On behalf of the Badminton Association of India, a protest was lodged saying that the match between Japan and Chinese Taipei was fixed and that Japan had deliberately lost that match in order to have a better draw in the next round.  The Indian appeal was turned down by force.

See also
India at the 2012 Summer Paralympics
India at the 2012 Winter Youth Olympics
Indian sports

References

External links
 Olympics London 2012 

Nations at the 2012 Summer Olympics
2012
2012 in Indian sport